Acacia coolgardiensis, commonly known as sugar brother or spinifex wattle, is a shrub  in the family Fabaceae.  Endemic to Western Australia, it is widely distributed in the semi-arid spinifex country from Carnarvon to Kalgoorlie.

Sugar brother grows to a height of about three metres.  It nearly always has multiple stems.  Like most Acacia species, it has phyllodes rather than true leaves.  These are green, and may be up to 10 centimetres long and about three millimetres wide.  The flowers are yellow, and held in cylindrical clusters up to two centimetres long and five millimetres wide.  The pods are papery, about three millimetres wide.

Taxonomy
It was first published by Joseph Maiden in 1920, based on a specimen collected by Leonard Clarke Webster near Coolgardie in 1900, and a description of the fruit near Kunonoppin supplied by Frederick Stoward. The specific name is in reference to the town of Coolgardie.

There are three recognised subspecies:
 A. c. subsp. coolgardiensis
 A. c. subsp. effusa
 A. c. subsp. latior

See also
 List of Acacia species

References

 
 
 
 

Acacias of Western Australia
coolgardiensis
Fabales of Australia
Taxa named by Joseph Maiden